Han Myeong-hoe (Hangul: 한명회, Hanja: 韓明澮; 26 November 1415 – 28 November 1487) was a Korean politician and soldier during the Joseon period.

He was the most trusted tactician of Grand Prince Suyang during the 1453 coup and the subsequent events that resulted into Suyang becoming King Sejo. He was listed as a first rank meritorious subject in 1453 (정난공신, 靖難功臣) and in 1455 (좌익공신, 佐翼功臣).

In 1460, his third daughter, Han Naeng-yi, married Crown Prince Haeyang (the future King Yejong).

Between 1466 – 1467, Han Myeong-hoe became the Chief State Councillor of Joseon, and his youngest daughter married Prince Jalsan (the future King Seongjong).

In 1468, Crown Prince Haeyang became Yejong, the 8th King of the Joseon Dynasty, and Han Myeong-hoe's daughter, Han Naeng-yi, was posthumously honoured Queen Jangsun and her father was reappointed Chief State Councillor.

In 1469, when Yejong died, Han Myeong-hoe was instrumental in the decision to recuse both Yejong's son as too young and Jalsan's older brother as too weak. As a result, Jalsan was chosen to become King Seongjong, the 9th King of the Joseon Dynasty, with Han Song-yi as Queen Consort (posthumously known as Queen Gonghye).

Family 
 Great-grandfather
 Han Soo (한수, 韓脩) (1333 – 1384)
 Great-grandmother
 Lady Gwon of the Andong Gwon clan (안동 권씨, 安東 權氏)
 Grandfather
 Han Sang-jil (한상질, 韓尙質) (1350 – 10 January 1400/1410)
 Grandmother
 Lady Seong of the Cheongpung Seong clan (청풍 송씨); Han Sang-jil’s second wife
 Father
 Han Gi (한기, 韓起) (1393 – 1429)
 Aunt: Lady Han of the Cheongju Han clan (청주 한씨, 淸州 韓氏)
 Uncle: Yun Geun (윤곤, 尹坤) (? – 11 March 1422)
 Cousin: Yun Sam-san (1406 – 1457) (윤삼산, 尹三山)
 Cousin-in-law: Lady Lee of the Goseong Lee clan (고성 이씨)
 First cousin-once-removed: Yun Ho (1424 – 9 April 1496) (윤호, 尹壕)
 Cousin-in-law: Internal Princess Consort Yeonan of the Damyang Jeon clan (연안부부인 담양 전씨, 延安府夫人 潭陽 田氏) (1421 - 27 October 1496)
 First cousin-twice-removed: Queen Jeonghyeon of the Papyeong Yun clan (정현왕후) (21 July 1462 – 13 September 1530)
 Mother
 Lady Yi of the Yeoju Yi clan (여주 이씨, 驪州李氏)
 Grandfather: Yi Cheok (이척, 李逖) (1370 – 1419)
 Grandmother: Lady Park of the Suncheon Park clan (순천 박씨, 順天 朴氏)
 Sibling(s)
 Younger brother: Han Myeong-jin (한명진, 韓明溍) (1426 – 1454)
 Sister-in-law: Lady Gwon of the Andong Gwon clan (안동 권씨)
 Unnamed nephew
 Niece: Lady Han of the Cheongju Han clan (청주 한씨, 淸州 韓氏)
 Wife
 Internal Princess Consort Hwangryeo of the Yeoheung Min clan (황려부부인 여흥 민씨, 黃驪府夫人 驪興 閔氏) (? – 1479/1490)
 Father-in-law: Min Dae-saeng (민대생, 閔大生) (1372 – 1467)
 Mother-in-law: Lady Heo of the Yangcheon Heo clan (양천 허씨, 陽川 許氏)
 Children
 Daughter: Lady Han of the Cheongju Han clan (청주 한씨, 淸州 韓氏)
 Son-in-law: Shin Ju (신주 고령 신씨, 申澍 高靈 申氏) of the Goyreong Shin clan (1434 – 21 February 1456)
 Grandson: Shin Jong-heub (신종흡, 申從洽) (1454 – ?)
 Grandson: Shin Jong-ok (신종옥, 申從沃) (1455 – ?)
 Grandson: Shin Jong-ho (신종호, 申從濩) (1456 – ?)
 Granddaughter-in-law: Princess Hyesuk (혜숙옹주, 惠淑翁主) (1478 – ?)
 Daughter: Lady Han of the Cheongju Han clan (청주 한씨, 淸州 韓氏)
 Brother-in-law: Yun Ban (윤반 파평 윤씨, 尹磻 坡平 尹氏) of the Papyeong Yun clan
 Daughter: Han Naeng-yi (한냉이), Queen Jangsun of the Cheongju Han clan (장순왕후, 章順王后) (22 February 1445 – 5 January 1462)
 Son-in-law: King Yejong of Joseon (조선 예종, 朝鮮b睿宗) (1450 – 1469)
 Grandson: Yi Bun, Grand Prince Inseong (인성대군 분, 仁城大君 糞) (1461 – 1463)
 Son: Han Bo (한보, 韓堡) (1447 – 1522)
 Daughter-in-law: Lady Yi of the Hansan Yi clan (한산 이씨)
 Grandson: Han Gyeong-gi (한경기, 韓景琦)
 Grandson: Han Gyeong-jong (한경종, 韓景琮)
 Grandson: Han Gyeong-chim (한경침, 韓景琛)
 Granddaughter-in-law: Princess Gongshin (1481 – 1549)
 Grandson: Han Gyeong-hwan (한경환, 韓景環)
 Grandson: Han Gyeong-sun (한경순, 韓景珣)
 Grandson: Han Gyeong-ham (한경함, 韓景王/韓景咸)
 Daughter: Han Song-yi (한송이, 韓松伊), Queen Gonghye of the Cheongju Han clan (공혜왕후, 恭惠王后) (8 November 1456 – 30 April 1474)
 Son-in-law: King Seongjong of Joseon (성종대왕, 成宗大王) (19 August 1457 – 19 January 1494)
 Concubines
 Lady Jeong of the Yeonil Jeong clan (연일 정씨)
 Son: Han Bok (한복, 韓福)
 Daughter-in-law: Lady Jang of the Heungdeok Jang clan (흥덕 장씨)
 Son: Han Im (한임, 韓林)
 Daughter-in-law: Lady Yi of the Jeonju Yi clan (전주 이씨)
 Son: Han Soo (한수, 韓壽)
 Daughter-in-law: Lady Gwon of the Andong Gwon clan (안동 권씨)
 Lady Yi of the Jeonju Yi clan (전주 이씨)
 Son: Han Mok (한목, 韓睦)
 Son: Han Seok (한석, 韓碩)
 Son: Han Seo (한서, 韓恕)
 Son: Han Woo (한우, 韓佑)
 Son: Han Eun (한온, 韓瘟)
 Daughter: Lady Han of the Cheongju Han clan (청주 한씨, 淸州 韓氏)
 Son-in-law: Kang Hui-geon (강희건, 姜希蹇)
 Daughter: Lady Han of the Cheongju Han clan (청주 한씨, 淸州 韓氏)
 Son-in-law: Shin Seung-seon (신승손, 申承孫)
 Daughter: Lady Han of the Cheongju Han clan (청주 한씨, 淸州 韓氏)
 Son-in-law: Hong Gab-saeng (홍갑생, 洪甲生)
 Lady Jeong of the Yeonil Jeong clan (연일 정씨)
 Lady Seong of the Changnyeong Seong clan (창녕 성씨)

Popular culture 
 Portrayed by Kim Jong-gyul in the 2007–2008 SBS TV series The King and I.
 Portrayed by Lee Hee-do in the 2011 KBS2 TV series The Princess' Man.
 Portrayed by Jo Hee-bong in the 2011 SBS TV series Deep Rooted Tree.
 Portrayed by Son Byong-ho in the 2011–2012 JTBC TV series Insu, The Queen Mother.
Portrayed by Son Hyun-joo in the 2019 film Jesters: The Game Changers.

See also 
 Sin Sukju
 Han Hwak
 Gwon Ram
 Jeong Inji

References

External links 
 Han Myeong-hoe: NaverCast 
 Han Myeong-hoe: britannica
 Han Myeong-hoe: Nate 
 korea-fans.com 
 Korean History - Early Choson Period 

1415 births
1487 deaths
Korean Confucianism
Korean Confucianists
Korean revolutionaries
Cheongju Han clan
15th-century Korean poets
Posthumous executions